Bonne of Artois (1396 – 15 September 1425, Dijon) was Countess consort of Nevers by marriage to Philip II, Count of Nevers, which left her a widow at 18 or 19, and Duchess consort of Burgundy by marriage to Philip III, Duke of Burgundy, popularly known as Philip the Good. She served as regent of the County of Nevers during the minority of her son from 1415 until 1424.

Life
She was the daughter of Philip of Artois, Count of Eu, and Marie of Berry, daughter of John, Duke of Berry.

Countess of Nevers
She married first at Beaumont-en-Artois on 20 June 1413, Philip II, Count of Nevers. He was the son of Philip the Bold and Margaret III, Countess of Flanders.

Philip was killed at the Battle of Agincourt in 1415, against the English king Henry V, who won the battle against Charles d'Albret and Charles VI of France.

Regent
Their eldest son Charles succeeded as Count of Nevers. However, due to the child's minority, Bonne acted as regent from 1415 until 1424. She succeeded her aunt Jeanne d'Artois as Mademoiselle de Dreux and as Dame de Houdain.

Duchess of Burgundy
After Philip's death, Bonne married his nephew Philip the Good, Duke of Burgundy, on 30 November 1424 at Moulins-les-Engelbert. His first marriage to Michelle of Valois had produced no surviving issue and she had died young, so Philip married Bonne.

Bonne is sometimes confused with Philip's biological aunt, also named Bonne of Burgundy (1379–1399) in part due to the papal dispensation required for the marriage which made no distinction between a marital aunt and a biological aunt.

The marriage of Bonne and Philip lasted less than a year and produced no children. Bonne died on 15 September 1425 in Dijon.

Issue
She had two sons with her first husband, Philip II:
 Charles I, Count of Nevers. He married with Marie d'Albret, without descendants. 
 John II, Count of Nevers. He married three times and had three children.

Ancestry

References

|-

Duchesses of Burgundy
House of Artois
1396 births
1425 deaths
Countesses of Burgundy
Countesses of Flanders
Countesses of Artois
Philip the Good (Duke of Burgundy)
15th-century women rulers
14th-century French women 
14th-century French people 
15th-century French women 
15th-century French people